Niels is a male given name, equivalent to Nicholas, which is common in Denmark, Belgium, Norway (formerly) and the Netherlands. The Norwegian and Swedish variant is Nils. The name is a developed short form of Nicholas or Greek Nicolaos, after Saint Nicholas. Its pet form is Nisse, and female variants are Nielsine, Nielsina, and Nielsa.

Notable people with the name include:
Niels, King of Denmark (1065–1134)
Niels, Count of Halland (died 1218)
Niels Aagaard (1612–1657), Danish poet
Niels Aall (1769–1854), Norwegian businessman and politician
Niels Henrik Abel (1802–1829), Norwegian mathematician
Niels Arestrup (born 1949), French actor
Niels Viggo Bentzon (1919–2000), Danish composer and pianist
Niels Bohr (1885–1962), Danish physicist and Nobel Prize recipient
Niels Busk (born 1942), Danish politician
Niels Ebbesen (died 1340), Danish squire and national hero
Niels Feijen (born 1977), Dutch pool player
Niels Ferguson (born 1965), Dutch cryptographer
Niels Friis (died 1508), Roman Catholic prelate and bishop of Viborg, succeeding Niels Glob
Niels Gade (1817–1890), Danish musician
Niels Glob, Roman Catholic prelate and bishop of Viborg (1478–1498)
Niels Giffey (born 1991), German basketball player
Niels Hansen Jacobsen (1861–1941), Danish sculptor
Niels Helveg Petersen (1939–2017), Danish politician
Niels Hemmingsen (1513–1600), Danish theologian
Niels Holst-Sørensen (born 1922), Danish athlete and general
Niels Jonsson Stromberg af Clastorp (1646–1723), Swedish soldier and politician
Niels Juel (1629–1697), Danish admiral
Niels Christian Kaldau (born 1974), Danish badminton player
Niels Kaas (1535–1594), Danish politician
Niels Kaj Jerne (1911–1994), Danish immunologist and Nobel Prize recipient
Niels Krabbe (born 1951), Danish ornithologist
Niels Lan Doky (born 1963), Danish jazz pianist
Niels de Langen (born 1998), Dutch para-alpine skier
Niels Lauritz Høyen (1798–1870), Danish art historian
Niels Neergaard (1854–1936), Danish historian and politician
Niels Nikolaus Falck (1784–1850), Danish jurist and historian
Niels-Henning Ørsted Pedersen (1946–2005), Danish jazz bassist
Niels Ryberg Finsen (1860–1904), Danish physician and Nobel Prize recipient
Niels Schneider (born 1987), Canadian actor
Niels Steensen, also known as Nicolas Steno (1638–1686), Danish scientist and Catholic bishop
Niels Treschow (1751–1833), Norwegian philosopher and politician
Niels van den Berge (born 1984), Dutch politician
Niels van der Zwan (born 1967), Dutch rower
Niels van Steenis (born 1969), Dutch rower

See also
Neil
Nicholas
Niel (disambiguation)
Nils

Danish masculine given names